László Palóczy (14 October 1783 – 27 April 1861) was a Hungarian politician, who served as acting Speaker of the House of Representatives as oldest member of the lower house in 1849.

He was sentenced to death after the surrender at Világos but the sentence was changed to life imprisonment. After his release he moved to Miskolc. He became a member of the Diet of Hungary again in 1861, shortly before his death. He was the oldest member too. A street was named after him in his birthplace.

References
 Jónás, Károly - Villám, Judit: A Magyar Országgyűlés elnökei 1848-2002. Argumentum, Budapest, 2002. pp. 81–84

1783 births
1861 deaths
Speakers of the House of Representatives of Hungary
People from Miskolc
19th-century Hungarian politicians
Politicians from the Austrian Empire